Jack Jones may refer to:

Arts and entertainment

Music
Jack Jones (American singer) (born 1938), American jazz and pop singer
Jack Jones, stage name of Australian singer Irwin Thomas (born 1971)
Jack Jones (Welsh musician) (born 1992), Welsh musician, songwriter and poet

Other media
Jack Jones (novelist) (1884–1970), Welsh novelist and playwright
Jack Jones (journalist) (1924–2011), American journalist
Jack Jones (TV journalist) (1949–1991), American television journalist

Fictional characters
Lance-Corporal Jack Jones, a character in the sitcom Dad's Army
Jack Jones, a banker in the Oliver Stone film Nixon

Politics 
Jack Jones (Silvertown MP) (John Joseph Jones, 1873–1941), British Labour MP for Silvertown
Jack Jones (Rotherham MP) (John Henry Jones, 1894–1962), British Labour MP for Bolton, later MP for Rotherham
Jack Jones (Australian politician) (John Joseph Jones, 1907–1997), member of the Victorian Legislative Council for Ballarat
Jack Jones (trade unionist) (1913–2009), British trade union leader

Sports

Association football (soccer)
Jack Jones (footballer, born 1869) (1866–1931), Wales international footballer who played for Grimsby Town, Sheffield United and Tottenham
Jack Jones (footballer, born 1874) (1874–1904), English football forward for Small Heath, Bristol Rovers and Tottenham 
Jack Jones (footballer, born 1891) (1891–1948), English football defender for Birmingham, Nelson and Crewe
Jack Jones (1920s Welsh footballer), footballer for Wrexham and Crewe Alexandra
Jack Jones (footballer, born 1907), Irish football defender for Linfield, Hibernian, Glenavon, Bath City and Ireland (IFA)
Jack Jones (footballer, born 1913) (1913–1995), English football player for Everton and Sunderland
Jack Jones (footballer, born 1916) (1916–1999), Scottish footballer
Jack Jones (footballer, born 1921) (1921–2001), Welsh footballer for Wrexham, Doncaster Rovers and New Brighton
Jack Jones (soccer, born 1987) (born 1987), American soccer player

Australian rules football
Jack Jones (footballer, born 1887) (1887–1964), Australian rules footballer for South Melbourne
Jack Jones (footballer, born 1888) (1888–1960), Australian rules footballer for University
Jack Jones (footballer, born 1924) (1924–2020), Australian rules footballer for Essendon

Rugby
Jack Jones (rugby union, born 1886) (1886–1951), Welsh international rugby union player
Jack Jones (rugby, born 1890) (1890–?), rugby union and league footballer for Wales (RU), Abertillery, and Oldham (RL)
Jack Jones (Australian rugby league) (fl. 1925–1933), Australian rugby league player

Other sports
Jumping Jack Jones (1860–1936), American baseball pitcher
Jack Jones (cricketer) (1899–1991), cricketer for Western Australia and Australian rules football player and coach
Jack Jones (water polo) (1925–2016), English Olympic water polo player
Jack Jones (American football) (born 1997), American football player

Other 
Jack Harold Jones (1964–2017), American serial killer

See also 
John Jones (disambiguation)
Jack & Jones, clothing brand owned by Danish clothing company Bestseller
Jak Jones (born 1993), Welsh professional snooker player